The Dowleswaram Barrage Or Dhavaleshwaram Barrage was an irrigation structure originally built in 1852 on the lower stretch of the Godavari River before it empties into the Bay of Bengal. It was rebuilt in 1970 when it was officially renamed as Sir Arthur Cotton Barrage or Godavari Barrage.

Geography

The Godavari River empties its water into the Bay of Bengal after flowing nearly fifty miles from the Dowleswaram Barrage. Rajahmundry is a city situated on the left bank of Godavari River. Upstream, where the river is divided into two streams; the Gautami to the left and the Vasistha to the right, forms the joining line between the West Godavari and the East Godavari districts. The dam alignment crosses two mid stream islands.

Original Dowleswaram Barrage

The original Dowleswaram Barrage (also spelled Dowlaisweram or Dowlaiswaram) was built by a British irrigation engineer, Sir Arthur Thomas Cotton and completed in 1850. The barrage was constructed in four sections, which allowed flood passage during the construction period. The Dowleswaram Barrage was 15 feet high and 3.5 km long.

Cotton's many projects averted famines and stimulated the economy of southern India. Before this barrage was constructed many hectares of land has been flooded with water and was unused. The water would be worthlessly going into sea. But when Sir Arthur Thomas Cotton had built the barrage those unused lands were brought into cultivation and the water was stored and used. The Cotton Museum was constructed on behalf of Cotton's memory. It is a tourist attraction in  Rajahmundry.

Modern Sir Arthur Cotton Barrage / Godavari Barrage

In 1970, the barrage was heightened to 10.6 m. The reservoir has 3.12 Tmcft gross storage capacity and dead storage of 2.02 Tmcft at  MSL.

Inadequate water inflows
During the rabi season of 2022–23, adequate water is not supplied to the canals due to a lack of sufficient water inflows into the reservoir as sufficient water had not been stored earlier in the 
upstream Polavaram reservoir. The natural flows normally available during the dry season in the Godavari River are being stored in Medigadda and Sammakka Sagar reservoirs which used to be available for use in Godavari Delta. To build up the water level/storage in the Polavaram reservoir to enable adequate water release downstream, water is released from the Donkarayi reservoir directly without using it for power generation in the lower Sileru power station. At least 60 tmcft water storage is needed in the Polavaram reservoir or up to the safe level limit of the upper coffer dam of the Polavaram Project to supply water to the total cropped area during the rabi season.

See also
List of dams and reservoirs in Andhra Pradesh
List of dams and reservoirs in India
Prakasam Barrage
Godavari Water Disputes Tribunal

References

External links

Dams on the Godavari River
Tidal barrages
Dams in Andhra Pradesh
Buildings and structures in East Godavari district
Transport in East Godavari district
1850 establishments in India
Dams completed in 1850
Dams completed in 1970
20th-century architecture in India
Water Heritage Sites in India